Calliostoma adspersum, common name the spotted Brazilian top shell, is a species of sea snail, a marine gastropod mollusk in the family Calliostomatidae.

Description
The length of the shell varies between 16 mm and 28 mm. The conical shell is imperforate, whitish-gray, flammulated with rufous, and encircled by delicate granulate threads. The plane whorls are angulated with a sharp carina  a little above the sutures, the last one biangulate with a second carina. The sculpture of the upper surface consists of five, fine thread-like or hair-like granulate spirals, the last forming the sharp carina over the suture. There are in the interstices finer granulose lines. The base of the shell is a little convex with 9 to 10 concentric, little elevated smooth lirae, nearly as broad as their interstices. The aperture is rhomboidal with rounded angles. The oblique columella is cylindrical and subdentate at its base, bounded by a pit at its insertion.

Distribution
This marine species occurs from Colombia to Southern Brazil.

References

External links
 To Biodiversity Heritage Library (2 publications)
 To Encyclopedia of Life
 To USNM Invertebrate Zoology Mollusca Collection
 To ITIS
 To World Register of Marine Species
 

adspersum
Gastropods described in 1851